Charlotte Lake (also known as Charlotta Lake, or Rhoda Lake) is a lake in the Sierra Nevada, located in Kings Canyon National Park, eastern Fresno County, California.

See also 
 Charlotte Dome
 List of lakes in California

References 

Lakes of Fresno County, California
Kings Canyon National Park
Lakes of California
Lakes of Northern California